Lillian Hoban (May 18, 1925 – July 17, 1998) was an American illustrator and children's writer best known for picture books created with her husband Russell Hoban. According to OCLC, she has published 326 works in 1,401 publications in 11 languages.

Biography

Lillian Hoban born in Philadelphia and was the youngest of three sisters.  She attended the Philadelphia High School for Girls.  She was always interested in art and wanted to become an artist. At age 14, she started classes at the Graphic Sketch Club where she met her husband and collaborator Russell Hoban.  She won a scholarship to the Philadelphia Museum School of Art, where she majored in Illustration. After getting married and settling in New York City, Hoban gave up art to study dance at the Hanya Holm School. She studied dance for ten years. She danced professionally and did choreography on a musical show called Tropical Holiday that aired live on Saturday nights when, according to Hoban, television was in its infancy.  She also taught dance for a number of years. She dedicated herself to dancing until the birth of her second child, Abrom (Brom).[2]

The Hobans raised their four children, Phoebe, Brom, Julia and Esmé, in Norwalk, CT before moving to a woodsy two-and-a-half-acre property in Wilton, CT. The Hobans moved to London in 1969.  But within a year, the marriage had become strained. Lillian and the children soon moved back to Wilton while Russell stayed in London and remarried in 1975.  Lillian began writing her own stories upon returning to the United States. She based her tales on her experiences with her children and their neighborhood friends.[1] 

Lillian Hoban died at Presbyterian Hospital in Manhattan in 1998 (aged 73) from heart failure.[1]

Early career as an illustrator for Russell Hoban 
Her earliest and, perhaps, greatest collaboration was with her husband Russell in the 1960s and early 1970s.  The centerpiece of this work was the Frances series written by Russell.  The character of Frances was inspired by the Hoban's next door neighbors in Norwalk, CT whose daughter found multiple ways of putting off her bedtime.

Bedtime for Frances 
The first book in the series, Bedtime for Frances, was illustrated by Garth Williams. Mr. Hoban, who illustrated his first book by Harper himself, sought another illustrator for Frances because, as he explains, he could not do soft and cuddly. Ursula Nordstrom suggested Williams whose soft and furry animals seemed the perfect fit. Russell originally depicted Frances as a vole, but Williams suggested a badger.  Nordstrom agreed persuading Russell that it would be too difficult to depict a likeable vole for children.  The original illustrations of Frances as a vole can be found in the Lillian Hoban Collection at the Beinecke Rare Book and Manuscript Library at Yale University.

Other Frances books 
Lillian took over as illustrator with the second book in the series, A Baby Sister for Frances, and illustrated the rest. She was faithful to the badger image first established by Garth Williams but brought her own style and unique charm to the badger family. Hoban used expressive body postures and facial gestures to capture the emotions of the characters and give them an authentic, true to life quality.  The Hobans used their eldest daughter Phoebe as the model for Frances.

Themes and popularity of the Frances series 
The theme that runs through all of the Frances books, and much of the Hobans' collaboration, is that problems can be resolved with just a little bit of thought and creativity.  The feeling of a close, supportive, and loving family that is depicted through the illustrations and stories, according to Russell, is one of the reasons that the books have met with such widespread approval of readers and professionals. Another reason the author cites for the popularity of the series is that, beginning with the second Frances book, the title character creates and sings songs to express her emotions. Tamar Mays, senior editor of Harper Collins Children's book division, cites the loving kindness of the parents, the universal childhood moments, and the strong individuality and creative imagination of the character of Frances as reasons why the books have remained so popular.

I Can Read Frances books 
The strong sales of A Bargain for Frances in the I-Can-Read format, led to the republishing of many of the rest of the titles originally published as picture books in this easy to read format: Bread and Jam for Frances (2008), Best Friends for Frances (2009), A Baby Sister for Frances (2011) and A Birthday for Frances (2012).  Both Russell and his daughter Phoebe helped in this conversion.

Other Hoban collaborations 
In all, the Hobans collaborated on at least twenty-seven children's books between 1964 and 1972.  Other standouts in the Lillian and Russell collaboration include the Brute Family books: The Little Brute Family (1966) and The Stone Doll of Sister Brute (1968).  The books tell the humorous and heartwarming tale of a mean-spirited family that discovers the contagiousness of a good feeling and niceness.  Both books were reprinted as Dell paperbacks and The Little Brute Family was republished by Farrar, Straus and Giroux in 2002. Emmet Otter's Jug-Band Christmas, based on the short story The Gift of the Magi by O'Henry told the story Emmett Otter and his widowed mother who enter a talent contest to earn money to buy each other Christmas gifts. The book won the Christopher Award in 1972.  In 1977 the Jim Henson Company produced the television film adaptation and a musical stage adaption in 2008. Emmet Otter's Jug-Band Christmas marked the Hobans' final collaborative effort.

Career 1967-1998

Arthur the Chimpanzee 
Lillian Hoban went on to find great success as an author and illustrator in the "I-Can-Read" books issued by Harper with early guidance from her long-time editor at Harper & Row, Ursula Nordstrom. Hoban explains that she did not set out to write an Easy Reader but simply wrote a story for children.  Nordstrom loved the manuscript and fit it into the standard I-Can-Read format without changing a word. The Arthur series soon became wildly popular among children.  Arthur the chimpanzee and his little sister Violet, explore many of the same trials and tribulations of childhood that she and her husband first explored with the Frances series.  Hoban's first book in the series, Arthur's Christmas Cookies (1972), came from listening to her children baking cookies in the kitchen.  Her son, Brom, devised a scheme to bake clay cookies, decorate them, and sell them for ornaments around the neighborhood to make money to buy Christmas gifts.  In the book, Arthur makes clay cookies by mistake and then decides to make ornaments.  Arthur's Honey Bear (1974) was also inspired by Hoban's experience with her own children who, along with the neighborhood kids, began selling their toys to each other.  The activity led to a 2:00 am phone call from a concerned father who offered fifty dollars for Scooby-Doo because his son could not sleep without his security toy.  Other popular titles written by Lillian Hoban in the I-Can-Read format include the Tilly the Mole and Mr. Pig books.

Riverside Kids series 
Hoban illustrated the Riverside Kids series written by Johanna Hurwitz that explores growing up in an apartment in the heart of New York City.  These titles include Busybody Nora, Superduper Teddy, Rip-Roaring Russell, and Elisa In The Middle. The last Riverside Kids book she illustrated was Ever-Clever Elisa published in 1997.

First Grade Friends series 
Hoban was especially fond of the First Grade Friends series of books that she illustrated for Miriam Cohen.  The series follows an entire classroom from pre-school to second grade.  The first book in the series, Will I Have a Friend was published in 1967.  Other titles in this series include Best Friends, The New Teacher, Tough Jim, and Starring First Grade.  The last book in the series, and the only book that takes place in 2nd grade, was titled The Real Skin Monster Mask, and was published in 1990.

Juvenile fiction 
Hoban briefly ventured into juvenile fiction with the publication of her one and only young adult novel, I Met a Traveler, in 1977.  Inspired by a young Jewish girl she met while visiting Israel, the novel tells the story of an eleven-year-old girl from Connecticut taken to Jerusalem by her eccentric mother.  Hoban had previously illustrated three other stories for older children, Mitchell F. Jayne's The Forest in the Wind (1966), Meindert Dejong's The Easter Cat (1971) and Russell Hoban's The Mouse and His Child (1967), the latter widely considered to be a classic.

The 1980s 
The 1980s marked Hoban's most productive period as she illustrated over forty books, the most of any decade. This included four more Arthur books, five books in the Riverside Kids series and eleven books authored by Miriam Cohen.

Harry's Song 
Hoban kicked off this very dynamic period with a small picture book entitled Harry's Song, her ode to the arts.  Picasso once said, "The purpose of art is washing the dust of daily life off our souls."  The book affirms that quote.  It tells the story of Harry Rabbit who sits on a rock and sings his songs of summer under the darkening shadow of a fall day while the animals around him prepare for winter.  One by one, the animals ridicule him for not helping his family in the practical duties of preparing for winter.  The field mice call him a dreamer and dumb. Mr. Chipmunk calls him a funny little bunny.  The brown bat calls him a bothersome, bumbling bunny and his mother's calls for him to come home as it is getting late. Harry continues his song under the thin moon.  When Harry finally succumbs to his mother's pleadings and arrives at his house, his three brothers scold him for not bringing anything home.  Harry corrects them.  "Yes I have," he says and sings his song to the delight of his loving mother who exclaims, "How lovely!  You've brought home the perfect song of a summer day to carry us through the winter.  You are a honey of a bunny!"

No, No Sammy Crow 
Hoban returned to familiar themes in No, No Sammy Crow (1981), telling the humorous and touching story of little Sammy Crow who cannot stop carrying around his baby blanket.  His caring mother encourages him to find a solution to his attachment.  In classic Hoban fashion, Sammy finds a creative resolution as he gives up his blanket to help hatch his new baby sibling.  In the original typed manuscript, the last page of the book is handwritten on the manuscript (possibly a last-minute inspiration) that reveals how Sammy Crow secretly kept a small piece of the soft blanket in his pocket that he “niced” with his two fingers while his sister praised him for giving up his blanket. This final touch is Hoban at her finest, tuned in so sensitively and empathetically with the feelings of a young child. The guilty expression of self-indulgence on Sammy's face in the illustration tells all.

Silly Tilly series 
In a departure from the themes of childhood she so often explored during her career, Hoban captured the endearing charm of an elderly woman who cannot seem to remember anything in the Silly Tilly books.  One of the early drafts of the first book, Silly Tilly and the Easter Bunny (1987), was titled, Lizzie Mole.  Later drafts show Grandma Mole lined out and replaced with Tillie Mole.  The epithet Silly was added at some point before the final publication of the book.  All three of the Silly Tilly books are set around the celebration of holidays, a fascination of Hoban's for much of her career that found their way into dozens of her books.  In 1965 Hoban was commissioned, along with Robert Krauss and Anita Lobel, to create oversized posters for the various holidays to display in school libraries and classrooms.  Hoban's posters included the following holidays: Halloween, Valentines, Christmas, George Washington and Abraham Lincoln (Robert Krauss illustrated the Easter poster and Anita Lobel, Thanksgiving). Holidays served as the basis of some of her very best work including her last Silly Tilly book, Silly Tilly's Valentine, that was published posthumously in December 1998, five months after her death.

Collaborations with her children 
Other notable books that Hoban illustrated during this period include collaborations with two of her children.  The Amy Loves series written by her daughter Julia portrays a child's joy at experiencing the changing seasons.  The books include Amy Loves the Loves the Sun, Amy Loves the Wind, Amy Loves the Rain and Amy Loves the Snow, all published in 1989.  Julia and Lillian followed those books with Buzby the cat (1990), an amusing and delightful story of a cat seeking his place in the world.  Hoban also collaborated with her oldest daughter Phoebe on two books, Ready-Set-Robot! (1982), alternately titled The Messiest Robot in Zone One in the Weekly Book Club edition, and a second book, the Laziest Robot in Zone One (1983).  Both books explore childhood traits and lessons in a futuristic setting.  Hoban's son Brom illustrated The Sea-Thing Child (1972) authored by his father, Russell Hoban.  He also wrote and illustrated three children's books.  Although she did not collaborate with Brom on any of these books, Hoban encouraged him to write from personal experience after reading some of his early attempts that included fantasy plots and monsters.  His book, October Fort (1981), was based on his own experience as child building a fort in his backyard.

Artistic influence and philosophy

Early home life 
Being raised in a family that valued reading, Hoban's interest in books and illustration started at an early age. Her earliest memories were of reading books in the living room with her two older sisters that they had brought home from the library while her parents read in their easy chairs. Many Sunday mornings as a young child she spent alone at the top of the stairs drawing Tillie the Toiler from the Sunday comics. Hoban's first thoughts that she would enjoy inventing and listening to stories were attributed to her older sister Sarah who had a fertile imagination and loved to tell her stories.

The Rittenhouse Square Library 
Hoban's parents also encouraged her interest in drawing by taking her to museums, buying her art supplies and eventually enrolling her in the Graphic Sketch Club. Hoban's interest in drawing was further encouraged by her teachers at school. From third grade on, every Thursday afternoon she went to a special drawing class with other children who had been selected from elementary schools around Philadelphia. Hoban also recalls spending a great deal of time in the children's book room at the Rittenhouse Square Library in Philadelphia where there was a long, low bench under the bookshelves that wrapped around the room.  This design made it easy for a child to reach the books on the shelves and then sit on the bench to read. Hoban spent countless hours at that library reading books.

Philosophy and technique 
Hoban did not consider herself an expert draughtsman. The first step in her illustration of characters, she explains, is capturing expression.  She explains that in preparing an illustration she will first practice making multiple expressions until she finds the one that best fits the character and situation. This process created many a humorous moment for her small children when they would sneak into her home studio and find their mother making faces in the mirror. Much of her early books were printed in two colors plus black. The illustrations were created through a tedious process known as three-color separation. She most often chose the primary colors of red and yellow.  Through the overlay process, she was able to make purple (red over black), green (yellow over black), orange (yellow over red). Hoban was delighted when the books started to be published in full color and she used pastels, water colors, and colored pencils sometimes in the same picture. See A Bargain for Frances, 1970 (three color separation) and the same title reprinted in 1992 in full color. Language, however, is first and foremost for Hoban as an author.  The sound of the words, the rhythm of the sentences must sound natural and pleasing to her ear and the ear of a child.

Lillian Hoban died at Presbyterian Hospital in Manhattan in 1998 (aged 73) from heart failure.[1]

Works

Selected books for children 
Author and Illustrator
 Arthur's Back to School Day. HarperCollins. 1996
 Arthur's Birthday Party. HarperCollins. 1999
 Arthur's Camp-Out. HarperCollinsPublishers. 1993
 Arthur's Christmas Cookies. Harper & Row. 1972
 Arthur's Funny Money. Harper & Row. 1981
 Arthur's Great Big Valentine. HarperCollins. 1989
 Arthur's Halloween Costume. Harper & Row. 1984
 Arthur's Honey Bear.  Harper & Row. 1974
 Arthur's Loose Tooth. Harper & Row. 1985
 Arthur's Pen Pal. Harper & Row. 1976
 Arthur's Prize Reader. Harper & Row. 1978
 Big Little Lion, Harper Festival. 1997
 Big Little Otter, Harper-Collins. 1997
 Harry's Song, Greenwillow. 1980
 Here Come Raccoons!, Holt-Rinehart-Winston. 1977
 I Met a Traveler, Harper and Row. 1977
 It's Really Christmas, Greenwillow. 1982
 Joe & Betsy and the Dinosaurs, Harper Collins. 1995
 Mr. Pig and Family, Harper and Row. 1980
 Mr. Pig and Sonny Too, Harper and Row. 1977
 No, No, Sammy Crow, Greenwillow. 1981
 Silly Tilly and the Easter Bunny. Harper & Row. 1987.
 Silly Tilly's Thanksgiving Dinner. Harper & Row. 1990. 
 Silly Tilly's Valentine. HarperCollins. 1998.
 Stick-in-the-Mud Turtle, Morrow. 1977
 The Case of the Two Masked Robbers, Harper and Row. 1986
 The Sugar Snow Spring, Harper and Row. 1973
 Turtle Spring, Greenwillow/World's Work. 1978

Authored by Russell Hoban
 A Baby Sister for Frances, Harper and Row. 1964
 A Bargain for Frances, Harper and Row. 1970
 A Birthday for Frances, Harper and Row. 1968
 Best Friends for Frances, Harper and Row. 1969
 Bread and Jam for Frances, Harper and Row. 1964
 Charlie the Tramp, Scholastic. 1966
 Egg Thoughts and Other Frances Songs, Harper and Row. 1972
 Emmet Otter's Jug-Band Christmas, Parent's Magazine Press. 1971
 Goodnight, W.W. Norton inc.1966
 Harvey's Hideout, Parent's Magazine Press. 1969
 Henry and the Monstrous Din, World's Work. 1966
 Herman the Loser, Harper and Brothers. 1961
 London Men and English Men, Harper and Row. 1962
 Nothing to Do, Harper and Row. 1964
 Save My Place, W.W. Norton inc. 1967
 Some Snow Said Hello, Harper & Row. 1963
 The Little Brute Family, Macmillan. 1966
 The Mole Family's Christmas, Parent's Magazine Press. 1969
 The Mouse and His Child, Harper and Row. 1967
 The Pedaling Man and Other Poems, W.W. Norton inc.  1968
 The Song in My Drum, Harper and Brothers. 1962
 The Sorely Trying Day, Harper and Row. 1964
 The Stone Doll of Sister Brute. Macmillan. 1968
 Tom and the Two Handles, Harper and Row. 1965
 Ugly Bird, Macmillan. 1969
 What Happened When Jack and Daisy Tried to Fool the Tooth Fairies, Four Winds Press. 1965

Authored by Miriam Cohen
 Bee My Valentine, Greenwillow. 1978
 Best Friends, Macmillan. 1971
 Don't Eat Too Much Turkey, Greenwillow. 1987
 First Grade Takes a Test, Greenwillow. 1980
 It's George, Greenwillow. 1988
 Jim Meets the Thing, Greenwillow. 1981
 Jim's Dog's Muffins, Greenwillow. 1984
 Liar, Liar, Pants on Fire! Greenwillow. 1985
 Lost in the Museum, Greenwillow. 1979
 No Good in Art, Greenwillow. 1980
 See You in Second Grade, Greenwillow. 1989
 See You Tomorrow, Charles. Greenwillow. 1983
 So What? Greenwillow. 1982
 Starring First Grade, Greenwillow. 1985
 The New Teacher, Macmillan. 1972
 The Real-Skin Monster Mask, Greenwillow. 1990
 Tough Jim, Macmillan. 1974
 When Will I Read? Greenwillow. 1977
 Will I Have a Friend? Macmillan. 1967

Authored by Johanna Hurwitz
 Busybody Nora, William Morrow. 1990
 "E" is for Elisa, William Morrow. 1991
 Elisa in the Middle, William Morrow. 1995
 Every-Clever Elisa, William Morrow. 1997
 Make Room for Elisa, William Morrow. 1993
 New Neighbors for Nora, William Morrow. 1991
 Nora and Mrs. Mind-Your-Own-Business, William Morrow. 1991
 Rip-Roaring Russell, William Morrow. 1983
 Russell and Elisa, William Morrow. 1989
 Russell Rides Again, William Morrow. 1985
 Russell Sprouts, William Morrow. 1987
 Superduper Teddy, William Morrow. 1980

Authored by Marjorie Weinman Sharmat 
 Attila the Angry, Holiday House. 1985
 I Don't Care, Macmillan. 1977
 Say Hello, Vanessa, Holiday House. 1979
 Sophie and Gussie, Macmillan. 1973
 The Story of Bentley Beaver, Harper and Row. 1984
 The Trip and Other Sophie and Gussie Stories, Macmillan. 1976

Co-authored with Phoebe Hoban
 Ready-Set-Robot!, Harper & Row. 1982
 The Laziest Robot in Zone One, Harper & Row. 1983

References

External links
 
  
 Brom Hoban and Phoebe Hoban (son and daughter) at LC Authorities, with 8 and 6 records
 Lillian Hoban's Illustrated Books in WorldCat
 
Lillian Hoban Papers. General Collection, Beinecke Rare Book and Manuscript Library, Yale University.

1925 births
1998 deaths
American women illustrators
American illustrators
American children's writers
Writers from Philadelphia
Artists from Philadelphia
Jewish American artists
Jewish women artists
American female dancers
Dancers from Pennsylvania
20th-century American women artists
20th-century American dancers
20th-century American Jews